Jayne Fenton Keane is a contemporary Australian poet.

Keane has published several books of poetry, a CD recording and is active as a performance poet and in multimedia poetry. The Transparent Lung has been adapted for radio in collaboration with Mike Ladd. She has received a Varuna Writers' Centre Fellowship, a grant from Queensland Arts and has performed at festivals in Australia, Canada and the United States. Additionally she is the founding and current director of National Poetry Week.

Works
Poetry
Fissure Blooms. (1994) 
Torn. (Plateau, 2000)
Ophelia's Codpiece. (Post Pressed, 2002) 
The Transparent Lung. (Post Pressed, 2003) 

CD
The Stalking Tongue. (1999)

References

External links
 www.poetinresidence.com Home page
 A Compendium of Eyes poem, mp3 readings & interview
 The Poetry of Jayne Fenton Keane at thylazine.org
 Two sound poems
 Poetry Beyond the Page essay at Philament Journal
 ‘Clicklit | Cinelit & the Invisible Hand <skinborgs & poetmachines>’ essay at RMIT

Year of birth missing (living people)
Australian poets
Living people
Writers from Queensland